Jaunpur City railway station is one of the railway stations in Jaunpur district, Uttar Pradesh, India. It is situated on the southwest side of the city about 5 km from Jaunpur Junction railway station. This station is under the administration of Northern Railway zone's Lucknow division and Varanasi–Jaunpur City–Sultanpur–Lucknow line. It is the cleanest railway station in whole city compared to Jaunpur Junction, Zafrabad Junction, Shahganj Junction and Janghai Junction.

Overview 

There are three platforms at this station. Station code is JOP. About 36 trains halt at this station. Jaunpur City Station (JOP) is well connected with Chandigarh, Jammu, Jaipur, Ahemadabad, Delhi, Howrah, Indore, Bhopal, Guwahati, Patna, Lucknow, Agra, Jhansi, Kanpur and Kamakhya.

There are 3 Platforms, 4 Railway Tracks, 1 Snack Store, Waiting hall, Multi Toilets, Parking and a park as well. Recently an overbridge was built on railway crossing near city station on Jaunpur- Mariyahu Road to avoid traffic caused by arrival and departure of trains.

See also 
Northern Railway zone
Oudh and Rohilkhand Railway
Kerakat railway station

References 

Lucknow NR railway division
Railway stations in Jaunpur district
Railway junction stations in India
Transport in Jaunpur, Uttar Pradesh
Buildings and structures in Jaunpur, Uttar Pradesh